Alexandros Samodurov (Greek: Αλέξανδρος Σαμοντούροβ; born April 20, 2005) is a Georgian-Greek professional basketball player for Panathinaikos of the Greek Basket League and the EuroLeague. He is a 2.10 m (6'11") tall power forward.

Early years and 10 Academy
Samodurov was born and raised in Evosmos, a suburb of Thessaloniki, Greece, to Georgian parents. He started playing basketball as a kid, joining Nikos Chatzivrettas's 10 Academy at the age of 10. His first steps on the next level were made at the 2019 Greek U16 Championship, where he averaged 4.3 points, 3 rebounds and 1 steal in 12 minutes, despite playing two years up, at age 14.
His huge progress paid off in the 2021–22 season, where Samodurov's star shone in the Rising Stars tournament, organized by the Hellenic Basketball Federation, hosting U18 teams. He was named the MVP of the tournament and led 10 Academy to the title, with his numbers being over the top, averaging 25.9 points (75.7% free throws, 66.7% two-pointers and 25.8% three-pointers), 13.3 rebounds, 2.1 assists and 2 blocks, in 35 minutes.

Professional career
On March 22, 2022, Samodurov signed a six-year contract (through the summer of 2028) with Greek powerhouse Panathinaikos of the Greek Basket League and the EuroLeague. He stayed in 10 Academy for the remainder of the 2021–2022 season, joining the Greens in the upcoming summer. On June 23, 2022, 10 Academy retired Samodurov's jersey, wishing the player all the best on his career.

National team career
On June 20, 2022, Samodurov was called up in the Greek U18 national team for the upcoming 2022 FIBA U18 European Championship. One day later, he was also called up by coach Dimitrios Itoudis in the Greek men's national team's selection for the 2023 FIBA Basketball World Cup qualification game against Great Britain.

Personal life
Samodurov has two brothers. The younger one, Angelos, who was born in 2008, also plays basketball.

References

2005 births
Living people
Greek men's basketball players
Greek people of Georgian descent
Greek Basket League players
Panathinaikos B.C. players
Power forwards (basketball)
Basketball players from Thessaloniki